Alberto Rujana Perdomo (Alberto Rujanah; born 29 March 1955) is a writer, athlete and soccer coach Lebanese of Jewish-Syrian nationalized Colombian descent.

Trajectory

Biography 
His family is  Syrian -  Lebanese made up of his parents and 12 siblings, who in search of a better future in the mid  50's decided to  emigrate to Colombia.

They came to the coffee country by boat crossing the entire ocean from their hometown Beirut to the city of Barranquilla. In Colombia they took another boat crossing the Magdalena River to the city of Neiva. Upon arrival, they changed their surnames to "Rujana Perdomo" and continued with their high school studies at the technical college.

Academic training 
Alberto is studying  physical education, recreation and sport at the Universidad Surcolombiana. Later he specialized as a soccer technical director in Italy where he did his practices in the AC Milan youth teams.

Debut with Millonarios FC 
Before finishing his university studies, he was contacted by the DT of  Millonarios of that time Gabriel Ochoa Uribe who, seeing that he was an outstanding student in all sports, decided to give him the opportunity to prove himself with the ambassador team, with whom he only played 1 professional game in the six months he was there in the position of right pointer.

Managerial career
Rujana studied around six months in Italy, with teams as AC Milan and Internazionale. The first professional team in which he worked as manager was Atlético Huila, team with which won the 1992 Categoría Primera B season in his first year at the club. On 1999, he becomes manager of Peruvian club Unión Minas. For the 2001, he returns to Colombia, where becomes manager of Real Cartagena, and the next year is hired by Unión Atlético Maracaibo of Venezuela.

In July 2010, he becomes manager of Salvadoran club C.D. FAS, but is fired three months later. In July 2012, he is contracted by the recently founded Categoría Primera B club Llaneros F.C., however he resigned in October 2013.

Personal life
Rujana was born in Beirut, Lebanon, from Syrian-Lebanese parents. From a family of 12 children, they moved to Vegalarga, a town in Huila. There, they Hispanicized their names and changed their surnames Rujana Perdomo. Rujana is a graduate of the South Colombian University, where he studied Licenciatura en Educación Básica, con énfasis en Educación Física, Recreación y Deportes (Bachelor of Primary Education with emphasis on Physical Education, Recreation and Sports).

Honours
Atlético Huila
Primera B: 1992

Managerial statistics

Books
 
 
 
 
 
Source:

References

External links
Profile in DIMAYOR

Living people
Colombian football managers
Expatriate football managers in El Salvador
1955 births
Sportspeople from Beirut
Colombian people of Lebanese descent
Colombian people of Syrian descent
Expatriate football managers in Peru
Expatriate football managers in Venezuela
Atlético Huila managers
Real Cartagena managers
Llaneros F.C. managers
C.D. FAS managers
Lebanese football managers
Syrian football managers
Sportspeople of Lebanese descent